The eighth season of South Park, an American animated television series created by Trey Parker and Matt Stone, began airing on March 17, 2004. The eighth season concluded after 14 episodes on December 15, 2004, and was written and directed by Trey Parker. The season deals with various topics that were relevant at the time of release. The episodes portray a spectrum of topics, from the effect of large scale retail corporations to immigration.

This is the first season to feature April Stewart as the majority of female characters instead of Eliza Schneider, who departed from the show due to a contract dispute.

Production history
On the DVD commentary for the episode "Cartman's Incredible Gift," series co-creator Trey Parker referred to the eighth season as "the year from hell," due to the grueling work schedule under which he and co-creator Matt Stone worked on both the series and their feature film Team America: World Police.

Episodes

References

External links

 South Park Studios - official website with streaming video of full episodes.
 The Comedy Network - full episodes for Canada

 
2004 American television seasons